Elliott Morris Devred (born 11 May 1998 in Birmingham) is a Welsh male squash player. As of November 2019, he was ranked 267 in the world, having reached a career high of 227 in June 2019. He won the 2019 Internazionali d'Italia professional tournament.

References 

1998 births
Living people
Welsh male squash players